Mogavero is an Italian surname. Notable people with the surname include:

Damian Mogavero, American entrepreneur and author
Domenico Mogavero (born 1947), Italian Roman Catholic bishop

Italian-language surnames